Thomas Edward Sizemore Jr. (November 29, 1961 – March 3, 2023) was an American actor. Born in Detroit, Michigan, his career started with small appearances in Born on the Fourth of July (1989), Lock Up (1989) and Blue Steel (1990). These appearances led to more prominent roles in films like Passenger 57 (1992), True Romance (1993), Striking Distance (1993), Natural Born Killers (1994), Strange Days (1995), Heat (1995) and The Relic (1997). After this he starred in Saving Private Ryan (1998), his most commercially successful film, and followed it up with appearances in Bringing Out the Dead (1999), Black Hawk Down (2001) and Pearl Harbor (2001). He received a Golden Globe nomination for his lead role in the television film Witness Protection (1999).

Biography

Thereafter, Sizemore's career struggled due to his drug addiction and legal troubles. Television network VH1 aired the reality series Shooting Sizemore (2007) which depicted his struggle to regain his career amid being addicted to methamphetamine and heroin. He would also participate in other reality series related to his addiction, like Celebrity Rehab with Dr. Drew (2010) and Celebrity Rehab Presents Sober House (2010). His later credits consist mostly of independent and low-budget film productions, with sporadic guest and recurring appearances in television series, most prominently in the revival series of Twin Peaks (2017).

Early life and education 
Thomas Edward Sizemore Jr. was born on November 29, 1961, in Detroit, Michigan. His mother, Judith (née Schannault), was a member of the city of Detroit ombudsman staff, and his father, Thomas Edward Sizemore Sr., was a lawyer and philosophy professor. He was raised Roman Catholic. Sizemore stated that his maternal grandfather was of French and Native American ancestry, and also that his grandmother was African-American.

Sizemore graduated from the Wayne State University in 1983, where he earned a bachelor's degree in theater, while he earned his masters' degree at the Temple University in 1986.

Career 
One of Sizemore's earliest film appearances was in Oliver Stone's Born on the Fourth of July (1989). His other early roles included Lock Up (1989), Harley Davidson and the Marlboro Man (1991), Point Break (1991), True Romance (1993), Natural Born Killers (1994), and Strange Days (1995). Sizemore starred in the independent drama film Love Is Like That (1993) with actress and model Pamela Gidley and had a supporting role in Kevin Costner's Wyatt Earp (1994) as Bat Masterson. For his performance in Heart and Souls (1993), he was nominated for the Saturn Award for Best Supporting Actor.

A succession of well-received supporting parts followed, beginning with his portrayal of Michael Cheritto in the heist film Heat (1995). Sizemore's first major leading role was as Vincent D'Agosta in The Relic (1997). Sizemore had a recurring role on the television series China Beach (1988–1991) as an enlisted man named Vinnie who was in love with Dana Delany's character. Sizemore continued to play leading and character parts in Devil in a Blue Dress (1995), Bringing Out the Dead (1999), and Witness Protection (1999). Saving Private Ryan (1998) proved to be his most commercially successful project, bringing in $217,000,000 at the box office. In the early 2000s, Sizemore appeared in the action films Pearl Harbor (2001), which also starred Ben Affleck, and Ridley Scott's Black Hawk Down (2001). He had a voice role as Sonny Forelli in the video game Grand Theft Auto: Vice City. Sizemore starred in Ticker (2001), an action film directed by Albert Pyun, with Steven Seagal and Dennis Hopper. He also starred in the well-reviewed but short-lived television drama series Robbery Homicide Division (2001). He appeared in the Mel Gibson-produced Paparazzi (2004) and played an undercover cop in Swindle (2006), opposite Sherilyn Fenn.

That same year, he starred in The Genius Club (2006), playing a terrorist who taunts seven geniuses into solving the world's problems in one night. He went on to a leading role in the action/thriller film Splinter (2006) with Edward James Olmos. The next year, television network VH1 aired a six-episode reality TV series called Shooting Sizemore (2007), depicting the actor's life as he struggled to regain his career in the midst of battling long-standing addictions to methamphetamine and heroin. The series also covered an ongoing legal appeal of his conviction for an assault of former Hollywood madam Heidi Fleiss. In the same year, the actor starred in the indie drama film Oranges (2007) with Tom Arnold and Jill Hennessy, which was directed by Syrian director and producer Joseph Merhi. Sizemore performed in two films that screened at the 2008 Sundance Film Festival, Red (2008) and American Son (2008). He was highly prolific that year, starring in The Last Lullaby (2008), The Flyboys (2008) with Stephen Baldwin, action film Stiletto (2008) with Tom Berenger and Michael Biehn, drama film Toxic (2008) with Costas Mandylor, and the Canadian drama A Broken Life (2008) with Ving Rhames.

He went on to appear in five episodes of the television series Crash (2008–2009) with Dennis Hopper and the comedy film Super Capers (2009). Sizemore starred in the indie horror film Murder 101 (2014) and co-starred with Kyra Sedgwick and Vincent D'Onofrio in the comedy-drama film Chlorine (2013). Sizemore starred alongside martial arts actor Mark Dacascos in the action film Shadows in Paradise (2010), followed by an appearance as a trucker in an episode of It's Always Sunny in Philadelphia. Sizemore appeared alongside the Insane Clown Posse in the comedy film Big Money Rustlas (2010) and the thriller heist Five Thirteen with Taryn Manning. Sizemore has roles in the films Suing the Devil (2011) and White Knight (2011), as well as the adventure film The Age of Reason (2014). He saw a career resurgence when he was cast as a series regular in the USA Network action program Shooter (2016), starring Ryan Phillippe. He went on to receive positive notices for the drama thriller Calico Skies (2016). In 2017, he appeared as insurance agent Anthony Sinclair in David Lynch's revival miniseries Twin Peaks, and portrayed FBI Agent Bill Sullivan in the drama film Mark Felt: The Man Who Brought Down the White House. In the same year, Sizemore is lead actor also in indie action film The Assault with Jordan Ladd.

In 2020, Sizemore appeared in C.L.E.A.N., a thriller/horror indie film and won a Vegas Movie Award and in 2021 won another Vegas Movie Award for his supporting role in indie film The Electric Man with Vernon Wells and Eric Roberts. In 2022, Sizemore won also an IndieFEST Film Award and Accolade Competition Award for his supporting role in The Electric Man. In January 2022, Sizemore joined the cast of The Legend of Jack and Diane, a feature film described as a female-fronted revenge thriller, directed and written by Bruce Bellocchi. The same year he was the lead star of the comedy series Barbee Rehab, alongside Bai Ling and Janice Dickinson.

Music 
Sizemore fronted the Hollywood rock band Day 8. Formed in 2002, the band recorded a four-song EP produced and recorded by Bradley Dujmovic and former Snot/Soulfly guitarist Mike Doling. Originally called "The Bystanders", the group included guitarist and co-writer Rod Castro, Alan Muffterson, Tyrone Tomke, and Michael Taylor.

Personal life 
Sizemore married actress Maeve Quinlan in 1996 but divorced in 1999 because of issues associated with his drug problems. In 2010, Sizemore appeared as a patient/castmember on VH1's third season of Celebrity Rehab. In July 2005, Sizemore became a father when Janelle McIntire gave birth to twins. Sizemore and McIntire eventually ended their relationship. On October 19, 2005, Vivid Entertainment released The Tom Sizemore Sex Scandal, a sex tape featuring Sizemore and multiple women. In the video, Sizemore claimed to have had sex with Paris Hilton, an allegation that she later denied, claiming it was a ploy by Sizemore to increase sales.

Substance abuse and legal problems 
Sizemore, who battled drug addiction from age 15, was convicted in 2003 of domestic violence against his girlfriend, the former 'Hollywood Madam' Heidi Fleiss. Sizemore was sentenced to seven months in jail and four months of drug treatment for repeatedly failing drug tests while on probation on March 25, 2005. Sizemore was caught attempting to fake the urine test using a Whizzinator. Fleiss's restraining order against him had lapsed by the time they appeared together in the third season of Celebrity Rehab with Dr. Drew in 2010. On May 8, 2007, while still on probation for a previous drug conviction, Sizemore was arrested outside the Four Points Sheraton hotel in Bakersfield, California, for possession of methamphetamine.

In 2013, Sizemore appeared on an episode of the talk show Dr. Phil, titled "Explosive Relationships", where he discussed his rise to stardom and the subsequent fallout after his years of struggling with substance abuse and run-ins with law enforcement as well as his relationship with Heidi Fleiss. In early 2014, a recording emerged of Sizemore alleging that former girlfriend Elizabeth Hurley had an affair with Bill Clinton in 1998. Under threat of legal action, Sizemore admitted the allegation was false. He elaborated that the recording was made without his knowledge during a time when he was battling substance abuse. Sizemore had been approached to appear in the first season of the reality television series Celebrity Rehab with Dr. Drew but declined. He met with Drew Pinsky about appearing in the second season, sitting in Pinsky's office for two hours, as Pinsky recounted, "sweating and completely high on drugs, talking a million miles an hour, acting like he was going to do it then deciding he didn't want to." Sizemore ultimately chose to appear in the show's third season but not in the season premiere. Because Heidi Fleiss was also in treatment on the show that season, both she and Sizemore had to consent to appear together. The season premiered in January 2010, with Sizemore's arrival at the clinic chronicled in the third episode. His reunion with Fleiss was amicable.

In February 2017, Sizemore pleaded no contest to two charges of domestic abuse for assaulting his girlfriend, for which he was sentenced to 36 months of summary probation, 30 days of community service and a year-long domestic violence program. He was also subject to two protective orders associated with the charges and ordered to pay various fees. The deal was made by Sizemore to avoid spending 210 days in jail. In a 2013 interview, Sizemore claimed that he began to achieve sobriety after a stern interrogation from fellow actor Robert De Niro. De Niro personally checked Sizemore into rehabilitation. On January 5, 2019, Sizemore was arrested for misdemeanor drug possession of "various illegal narcotics" in Burbank, California.

Sexual abuse allegations 
In November 2017, it was revealed by The Hollywood Reporter that Sizemore had been kicked off the set of the film Born Killers (then known as Piggy Banks) in 2003 for allegedly sexually molesting an 11-year-old actress when the film was in production near Salt Lake City, Utah. Sizemore denied any wrongdoing and was allowed back on the film set after the Salt Lake County prosecutor's office decided against going forward with the case "due to witness and evidence problems." In May 2018, the actress, by then 26 years old, filed a lawsuit against Sizemore, claiming that his alleged abuse caused longstanding emotional problems and seeking at least $3 million. A statement from Sizemore's publicist again denied the abuse, noting that nothing amiss was reported by a Born Killers staff member whose duty was supervising child actors on set. On August 27, 2020, USA Today reported that a Utah judge had dismissed the lawsuit. Sizemore again denied her claims, stating: "Beyond the loss of work and the pain and humiliation this has caused me and my family, the thought that an 11-year old girl would think I violated her, whether it be because she misconstrued some inadvertent touching when the director placed her upon my lap for the photo shoot or someone else instilled this idea in her head for whatever malicious, self-serving reasons, is what devastates me most."

Death 
On February 18, 2023, Sizemore suffered a brain aneurysm at his Los Angeles home and was hospitalized at Providence Saint Joseph Medical Center in critical condition. Charles Lago, his representative, issued a statement on February 27 that doctors had determined there was "no further hope and have recommended end-of-life decision" to Sizemore's family. Sizemore died on March 3, 2023.

Filmography

Film

Television

Video games

Awards and nominations

Book

References

External links 
 
 
 
 

1961 births
2023 deaths
20th-century American male actors
21st-century American male actors
American male film actors
American male television actors
American male voice actors
American people of French descent
American people who self-identify as being of Native American descent
Deaths from intracranial aneurysm
Film producers from Michigan
Male actors from Detroit
Michigan State University alumni
Neurological disease deaths in California
Participants in American reality television series
Temple University alumni
Wayne State University alumni